Carvill may refer to:

Carvill (surname)
Carvill Hall, a historic home in Maryland, United States
Carvill Hurricane Index that describes the potential for damage from an Atlantic hurricane